Statistics of Danish National Football Tournament in the 1923–24 season.

Province tournament

First round
IK Viking Rønne 0–1 Boldklubben 1901

Second round
Boldklubben 1901 6–2 Holbæk IF
Boldklubben 1913 7–1 Viborg FF

Third round
Boldklubben 1901 1–3 Boldklubben 1913

Copenhagen Championship

Final
Boldklubben 1903 1–1 Boldklubben 1913

Replay 1
Boldklubben 1903 1–1 Boldklubben 1913

Replay 2
Boldklubben 1903 5–0 Boldklubben 1913

References
Denmark - List of final tables (RSSSF)

Top level Danish football league seasons
1923–24 in Danish football
Denmark